Swaminarayan is the founder of the Swaminarayan Sampradaya, previously known as under his guru, Ramanand Swami, as the Uddhav Sampraday.

Swaminarayan may also refer to:

 Satsangi, a follower of Swaminarayan
 Swaminarayan arti, ceremonial song in the Swaminarayan tradition
 Swaminarayan Jayanti, The birthday of Swaminarayan
 Jai Swaminarayan, a greeting used by followers of Swaminarayan